The 1973 Washington Star International was a men's tennis tournament that was played on outdoor clay courts at the Washington Tennis Stadium in Washington, D.C. The event was categorized as a Grade A tournament and was part of the 1973 Grand Prix circuit. It was the fifth edition of the tournament and was held  from July 23 through July 29, 1973, and was the first event on the US Tour leading up to the 1973 US Open. Third-seeded Arthur Ashe won the singles title and $11,000 prize money.

Finals

Singles
 Arthur Ashe defeated  Tom Okker 6–4, 6–2

Doubles
 Ross Case /  Geoff Masters defeated  Dick Crealy /  Andrew Pattison 2–6, 6–4, 6–4

See also
 1973 Union Trust Classic

References

External links
 ATP tournament profile
 ITF tournament edition details

Washington Open (tennis)
Washington Star International
Washington Star International
Washington Star International